Varun Mehta is an Indian short film and animation filmmaker. Mehta is known for his critically acclaimed short films based on social and environmental issues. He is mainly known for his work for internationally acclaimed films like The Unknown World "The Wonder Stone" and "Save Trees".

Background
Varun Mehta hails from Aligarh City of India. He has set up his film studio where he produces animation and short films. At present Mehta has made around 30 award winning short films featuring both animated and non-animated. His biggest achievement till date is winning 'Buzzgoo' Short Film Competition where he won the 'Best Film' award for his film 'The Unknown World' with a prize money of 5000$ at US. Mehta was felicitated at the 10th International Children's Film Festival Lucknow in 2018

Filmography
The Unknown World - Animated Short Film
 The Wonder Stone - Science Fiction Film
 Save Trees - Animated Short Film
 The Art of Farming - Documentary Short Film
 Ramu, A Gardener's Story - Documentary Short Film
 Diwali The Festival of Lights - Short Film based on the festival of Deepawali.
 Environmental Festival - Documentary Feature
 My Last Visions - Short Film
 A Dream that defined Science - Short Film
 Sometimes...Faith is Everything - Short Film (Upcoming)
 Travel and Life - Documentary Short Film (Upcoming)

References

External links
 
 Varun Mehta on Facebook

Living people
Year of birth missing (living people)
21st-century Indian film directors
Indian animated film directors
Indian animators
People from Aligarh